The Gymnastics competitions in the 1963 Summer Universiade were held in Porto Alegre, Brazil.

Men's events

Women's events

References
 Universiade gymnastics medalists on HickokSports

1963 in gymnastics
1963 Summer Universiade
Gymnastics at the Summer Universiade